Børre Meinseth (born 24 November 1966) is a retired Norwegian football defender.

He is the uncle of athletes Even Meinseth (1996) and Ingvild Meinseth (1999).

He played for Hødd, Bryne, Viking and Heerenveen and was capped 8 times for Norway.

He settled in Sola to work as a schoolteacher, and in 2003 he was the assistant coach of Sola FK under Gunnar Aase, in 2006 he was the head coach, then a youth coach.

References

1966 births
Living people
Norwegian footballers
People from Ulstein
People from Sola, Norway
IL Hødd players
Bryne FK players
Viking FK players
SC Heerenveen players
Eliteserien players
Norwegian First Division players
Eredivisie players
Association football defenders
Association football midfielders
Norway youth international footballers
Norway under-21 international footballers
Norway international footballers
Sportspeople from Møre og Romsdal